is a town located in Takaoka District, Kōchi Prefecture, Japan.

Geography
Nakatosa is located in the central part of Kōchi Prefecture, on the island of Shikoku, facing the Pacific Ocean to the east.

Neighbouring municipalities 
Kōchi Prefecture
 Susaki
 Tsuno
 Shimanto

Climate
Nakatosa has a Humid subtropical climate (Köppen Cfa) characterized by warm summers and cool winters with light snowfall.  The average annual temperature in Nakatosa is 15.6 °C. The average annual rainfall is 2533 mm with September as the wettest month. The temperatures are highest on average in January, at around 25.3 °C, and lowest in January, at around5.5 °C.

Demographics
Per Japanese census data, the population of Nakatosa has decreased steadily since the 1950s.

History 
As with all of Kōchi Prefecture, the area of Nakatosa was part of ancient Tosa Province. During the Edo period, the area was part of the holdings of Tosa Domain ruled by the Yamauchi clan from their seat at Kōchi Castle. The villages of Kure (久礼) and Kaminokae (上ノ加江) and Nishibun (西分村) were established with the creation of the modern municipalities system on October 1, 1889. They were subsequently elevated to town status on June 12, 1901 and January 1, 1915 and merged on July 1, 1957 to form the town of Naktosa. On January 1, 2006 the village of Ōnomi, from Takaoka District, was merged into Nakatosa.

Government
Nakatosa has a mayor-council form of government with a directly elected mayor and a unicameral town council of six members. Nakatosa, together with the municipalities of Shimanto, Tsuno and Yusuhara, contributes two members to the Kōchi Prefectural Assembly. In terms of national politics, the town is part of Kōchi 2nd district of the lower house of the Diet of Japan.

Economy
The local economy is centered on horticulture and greenhouse farming, with commercial fishing playing a smaller role.

Education
Nakatosa has two public elementary schools and three public middle schools operated by the town government. The town does not have a high school.

Transportation

Railway
 Shikoku Railway Company – Dosan Line

Highways 
  Kōchi Expressway
 }

References

External links

 Nakatosa official website
 Nakatosa official website 

Towns in Kōchi Prefecture